Isabella Stewart (autumn of 1426 – 13 October 1494/5 March 1499), was a Scottish princess who became Duchess of Brittany by marriage to Francis I of Brittany. Also known as Isabel, she was the second daughter of James I of Scotland and Joan Beaufort.

Life
It was said she was more beautiful than her elder sister Margaret, who married the Dauphin of France, and that John V, Duke of Brittany proposed to marry her; thus he sent ambassadors to Scotland to take a description of her. They reported "she was handsome, upright and graceful but she seemed simple too". The Duke's reply was "My friends, return to Scotland and bring her here, she is all I desire, and I will have no other; your clever women do more harm than good". The marriage contract was signed on 19 July 1441 and ratified on 29 September of that year, but the marriage did not take place as Duke John V died on 29 August 1442.

Once in Brittany, Isabella married instead with the eldest son of her groom, now Francis I, Duke of Brittany at the Château d'Auray on 30 October 1442, after which the whole court went to Rennes for eight days of festivities. On the marriage, her husband gave her an illuminated Book of Hours known as the Hours of Isabella Stuart.

Upon her husband's death in 1450, there were talks of Isabella's marrying Charles, Prince of Viana, heir to the disputed Kingdom of Navarre, but this proposal fell through due to the disapproval of Charles VII of France. Her brother James II of Scotland made vigorous efforts to persuade her to return to Scotland, where he hoped to arrange a second marriage for her. Isabella however refused, saying that she was happy and popular in Brittany and was in any case too frail to travel, and complaining that her brother had never paid her dowry. Isabella died ca. 1494/99, which suggests that her claims of ill health 40 years earlier were much exaggerated.

Issue
 Margaret of Brittany (1443–1469, Nantes), married Francis II, Duke of Brittany.
 Marie of Brittany (1444–1506), married John II, viscount of Rohan and count of Porhoët.

References

Sources

Alison  Weir, Britain's Royal Families
Annie Forbes Bush Memoirs of the Queens of France

|-

1426 births
1494 deaths
House of Stuart
House of Dreux
15th-century French women writers
Scottish princesses
Duchesses of Brittany
15th-century Breton women
15th-century Scottish women
Daughters of kings